Percy Furler (20 February 1904 – 23 January 1991) was an Australian rules footballer who played for and coached North Adelaide in the South Australian National Football League (SANFL).  Furler was a key figure in North Adelaide's 1930 and 1931 premierships, including the latter as captain.

Originating from the Noarlunga Football Club in the Southern Football Association, Furler played there together with his four brothers, Ray, Albert, Ross and Leslie, and was rejected by Sturt prior to joining North Adelaide.

In 1947, Furler was appointed Secretary of the North Adelaide Football Club, a position he would only hold for the one season.

In 2002 Furler was an inaugural inductee into the South Australian Football Hall of Fame.

Furler's nephew Bob Furler was also a notable footballer, winning the 1947 Tassie Medal.

References

External links 

1904 births
1991 deaths
North Adelaide Football Club players
North Adelaide Football Club coaches
Australian rules footballers from South Australia
South Australian Football Hall of Fame inductees
Place of birth missing